Robert F. Zuffelato (born November 26, 1937) is currently a scout for the Toronto Raptors with more than four decades of basketball experience at the NBA. He has served with the Raptors since September 1994, when he became the director of scouting.  He managed the club's scouting network and was responsible for evaluating professional and collegiate talent.  In 1998, he was promoted to director of basketball operations and then became the assistant general manager of the Raptors in 2001, remaining in that position for two seasons before returning to scouting to spend more time with his family.

Zuffelato also served as assistant coach for Toronto from 1995-1997 seasons and the second half of the 1997-1998 season. His coaching career began at the University of Michigan in 1959 and then Hofstra University. He had previously served as the head basketball coach at Boston College from 1971 to 1977, where he compiled an 83-80 record. His 1973 and 1974 teams went 21-9 in each year. He also led the Eagles to the ECAC New England Championship, the NCAA East Regional semifinals, and a third-place finish in the NIT.

From 1979 to 1983, he served as the head basketball coach at Marshall. At Marshall, he compiled a 71-41(.634) record. He then went on to serve as an assistant coach with the Golden State Warriors (1983–1986), Minnesota Timberwolves (1989–1990) and Dallas Mavericks (1990–1993).

Zuffelato has been inducted into two halls of fame for his basketball achievements. In April 2000, he was inducted into the Torrington High School Athletic Hall of Fame in Connecticut and in May 2001, he was inducted into the Central Connecticut State University Athletic Hall of Fame for his playing time in both basketball and golf.

Head coaching record

References

1937 births
Living people
American expatriate basketball people in Canada
American men's basketball players
Basketball coaches from Connecticut
Basketball players from Connecticut
Boston College Eagles men's basketball coaches
Central Connecticut Blue Devils men's basketball coaches
Central Connecticut Blue Devils men's basketball players
Dallas Mavericks assistant coaches
Golden State Warriors assistant coaches
Hofstra Pride men's basketball coaches
Marshall Thundering Herd men's basketball coaches
Michigan Wolverines men's basketball coaches
Minnesota Timberwolves assistant coaches
People from Torrington, Connecticut
Toronto Raptors assistant coaches